Lukáš Kubáň (born 22 June 1987) is a Czech professional footballer who plays as a defender for II liga club Stomil Olsztyn.

Club career
In June 2016, he joined Sandecja Nowy Sącz.

On 11 August 2020, he signed a one-year contract with Polish fourth-tier III liga club Wisła Puławy.

On 30 June, he rejoined Stomil Olsztyn, signing a one-year contract with an extension option.

International career
Kubáň played at the 2007 FIFA U-20 World Cup where the Czech Republic finished second. He also represented his country at under-21 level.

Honours
Czech Rupublic U-21
FIFA U-20 World Cup runner-up (1) 2007

References

External links
 
 

1987 births
Living people
Czech footballers
Association football defenders
Czech Republic youth international footballers
Czech Republic under-21 international footballers
1. FC Slovácko players
FC Zbrojovka Brno players
FK Fotbal Třinec players
GKS Bełchatów players
Sandecja Nowy Sącz players
OKS Stomil Olsztyn players
Wisła Puławy players
Czech First League players
Czech National Football League players
Ekstraklasa players
I liga players
II liga players
III liga players
Czech expatriate footballers
Expatriate footballers in Poland
Czech expatriate sportspeople in Poland